Benton Heights is an unincorporated community in Berrien County in the U.S. state of Michigan. It is also a census-designated place (CDP) for statistical purposes without any legal status as an incorporated municipality. Per the 2020 Census, the population was 3,652.The community is a part of Benton Charter Township and is adjacent to the city of Benton Harbor.

History
Benton Heights was formerly called "Euclid Center"; the present name was adopted in 1957.

Geography

Demographics

2020 census

2000 Census
As of the census of 2000, there were 5,458 people, 1,944 households, and 1,310 families residing in the CDP. The racial makeup of the CDP was 30.51% White, 65.63% Black or African American, 0.40% Native American, 0.13% Asian, 0.88% from other races, and 2.46% from two or more races. Hispanic or Latino of any race were 1.45% of the population.

There were 1,944 households, out of which 39.6% had children under the age of 18 living with them, 28.4% were married couples living together, 32.7% had a female householder with no husband present, and 32.6% were non-families. 27.6% of all households were made up of individuals, and 10.2% had someone living alone who was 65 years of age or older.  The average household size was 2.74 and the average family size was 3.31.

In the CDP, the population was spread out, with 36.3% under the age of 18, 8.6% from 18 to 24, 25.8% from 25 to 44, 17.1% from 45 to 64, and 12.2% who were 65 years of age or older.  The median age was 29 years. For every 100 females, there were 88.1 males.  For every 100 females age 18 and over, there were 79.6 males.

The median income for a household in the CDP was $19,651, and the median income for a family was $22,610. Males had a median income of $24,740 versus $17,816 for females. The per capita income for the CDP was $9,959.  About 31.3% of families and 38.0% of the population were below the poverty line, including 53.2% of those under age 18 and 19.6% of those age 65 or over.

References

Unincorporated communities in Berrien County, Michigan
Census-designated places in Michigan
Unincorporated communities in Michigan
Census-designated places in Berrien County, Michigan